State Highway 40 is a state highway in the Indian state of Andhra Pradesh.It connects Rajahmundry and Samalkota of East Godavari district of the state.

Route 

The route starts at Rajahmundry and passes through Dwarapudi, Anaparthy, Biccavolu and ends at Samalkota. The highway is being upgraded as it is one of the major roads of the Petroleum, Chemicals and Petrochemicals Investment Region (PCPIR) roads.

See also 
 List of State Highways in Andhra Pradesh

References 

Transport in Rajahmundry
State Highways in Andhra Pradesh
Roads in East Godavari district